Arthur Roy Leech (20 August 1896 – 10 November 1949) was an Australian rules footballer who played for the St Kilda Football Club in the Victorian Football League (VFL).

Notes

External links 

1896 births
1949 deaths
Australian rules footballers from Victoria (Australia)
St Kilda Football Club players
South Ballarat Football Club players